Slochteren is a village and former municipality with a population of 15,546 in the province of Groningen in the northeast of the Netherlands. On 1 January 2018, Slochteren merged with Hoogezand-Sappemeer and Menterwolde, forming the municipality Midden-Groningen.

The former municipality can be characterized as a chain of small villages dividing a mostly agricultural landscape. Having an agricultural background for at least a thousand years, the community houses for the most part commuters to nearby towns like Hoogezand, Groningen and Delfzijl.  The mansion Fraeylemaborg (a small 'castle', the oldest parts of which are dated in the Middle Ages) is located in Slochteren.

Geography 
The population centres in the former municipality are:

 Denemarken
 Froombosch
 Harkstede
 Hellum
 Kolham
 Lageland
 Luddeweer
 Overschild
 Schaaphok
 Scharmer
 Schildwolde
 Siddeburen
 Slochteren
 Steendam
 Tjuchem
 Woudbloem

Topographic map of the municipality of Slochteren, June 2015

Natural gas field 
Slochteren is in the center of the giant Groningen gas field, discovered in 1959, ensuring the position of the Netherlands as a major energy exporting country.

Gallery

References

External links

Midden-Groningen
Natural gas industry in the Netherlands
Former municipalities of Groningen (province)
Populated places in Groningen (province)
Municipalities of the Netherlands disestablished in 2018